Chelsea Shields (born November 1981) is an American bio-social anthropologist, placebo studies expert, human evolution expert, strategic consultant, women's rights activist, and TED Fellow. Shields and her work have appeared on broadcasts and publications including TED, Infants on Thrones, and TechInsider.

Shields was born in Provo, Utah to Heidi and Eric Shields and raised in a conservative Mormon family in Tooele, Utah and Gresham, Oregon. She graduated from Orem High School (Orem, Utah) in 2000, Brigham Young University (Provo, Utah) in 2004 with a degree in Anthropology and African Studies, and Boston University in 2017 with dual PhDs in Biological Anthropology and Cultural Anthropology.

Professional life

Placebo studies 

As a placebo studies expert, Shields examines the scientific/biological basis of the placebo response in humans including the implications and effects of ritual (including medical rituals, social rituals, and religious rituals), the subject-healer relationship, cultural context, and the efficacy of belief, faith, imagination, trust and hope in physical and emotional healing processes.

Shields' doctoral dissertation, "The Social Life of Placebos: Proximate and Evolutionary Mechanisms of Biocultural Interactions in Asante Medical Encounters" is an interdisciplinary study of the evolution of placebogenic responses–beneficial ones activated by psychosocial triggers–and their elicitation in Asante medical contexts. Based on extensive literature review in social, cultural, and medical studies over 26 months of intensive research in rural Ghana, West Africa, it examines the therapeutic efficacy of Asante medical encounters by analyzing rites of caregiving within an evolutionary framework.

Social susceptibility 
Much of Shields' academic work focuses on the concept of social susceptibility or why human bodies have evolved to be susceptible to social manipulation. Shields argued that grounding human behavior in social adaptations and viewing biocultural interactions in sickness and healing from an evolutionary perspective reveals important discoveries in placebo and ritual studies, religion, pain, stress, emotions, empathy, and social inequality.  Shields spoke about how these sociocultural, biological and evolutionary concepts clash at the 2013 TED Fellows Retreat in Whistler, British Columbia, Canada, where she used an Asante ethnographic case study of bonesetting to elucidate socially mediating pain mechanisms.

Strategic consulting 
Shields regularly consults with commercial and professional organizations in the areas of ethnographic research, brand strategy, learning strategy, content strategy, business strategy, audience segmentation, persona development, collaborative workshop planning and facilitation, and user experience. She also assists executives in the creation and delivery of high-profile talks, presentations, and lectures - both on and off camera.

Religious gender inequality 
Shields is also known for her activism to combat religious gender inequality. Shields gave a TED Talk on the topic of Religious Gender Inequality at the TED Fellows Retreat in September 2015 eventually entitled, "How I'm Working for Change Inside My Church." She is also a contributor featured in Mormon Feminism: Essential Writings.

Shields was president and co-founder of Mormons for ERA, a group dedicated to the passage of the Equal Rights Amendment. She was a co-founder and former board member for Ordain Women, a group dedicated to creating increased access to administrative and ecclesiastical decision-making capacities for women in the Church of Jesus Christ of Latter-day Saints through the ordination of women to the Aaronic and Melchizedek Priesthoods. She is also on the board of the Sunstone Education Foundation, an organization that discusses Mormonism through scholarship, art, short fiction, and poetry.

Awards and recognition 
 TED Fellow, 2009–present
 Wenner-Gren Foundation Dissertation Grant, 2009
 Marion and Jasper Whiting Foundation Fellowship, 2009
 Boston University Women’s Guild Scholarship, 2012
 Boston University Graduate Research Abroad Scholarship, 2011
 Foreign Language and Area Studies Fellowship, 2007

Bibliography  

 Chelsea Shields, The Social Life of Placebos: Proximate and Evolutionary Mechanisms of Biocultural Interactions in Asante Medical Encounters PhD diss., Boston University, 2017.
 TED.com (TED Fellows Retreat). How I'm Working for Change Inside My Church
 Why Belonging Matters: Fellows Friday with Chelsea Shields Strayer
 TED conference (TED India). Mysore, India: Presented "A New Healthcare: What We Can Learn from Indigenous Healing”
 Harvard Medical School’s Osher Research Center Healing & Placebo Talks Series. Cambridge, MA: Presented Psychoprophylaxis Applied: Education, Relaxation, and Control in Asante Healthcare.
 TED Fellows retreat. Whistler, British Columbia, Canada: Social Susceptibility; Why our Most Painful, Joyful and Memorable Experiences Exist in the Social Domain  
 Exponent II: What Being an LDS Feminist Means to me 
 Infants On Thrones. The Placebo Effect 
 Mormon Woman Project.Choosing Between Two Rights with Chelsea Shields Strayer

References

External links 
 TED Talk: "How I'm Working for Change Inside My Church"
 

Living people
1981 births
Mormon feminists
TED Fellows
People from Provo, Utah
Brigham Young University alumni
Boston University alumni
American women anthropologists
Placebo researchers